William Harry Butler (born 1917) was a boxer who competed for England.

Boxing career
Butler represented England and won a gold medal in the 54 kg division at the 1938 British Empire Games in Sydney, New South Wales, Australia.

Personal life
He was an electrician by trade and lived in Stratford Street, Upper Stoke, Coventry during 1938.

References

1917 births
English male boxers
Boxers at the 1938 British Empire Games
Commonwealth Games medallists in boxing
Commonwealth Games gold medallists for England
Possibly living people
Bantamweight boxers
Medallists at the 1938 British Empire Games